Jagbir Singh (born 20 February 1965) the former Indian field hockey Centre Forward represented India in two Olympics (1988 & 1992), 1990 World Cup and was a leading light of the Indian team in all the major tournaments, for a decade, from 1985–95, including two Asian Games (1986 & 1990), the 1989 Asia Cup & Champions trophy.

He was awarded the Arjuna Award for hockey by the Government of India in 1990, "Laxman Award" in 2004 & highest civilian samman "Yash Bharti Award" for the year 2015–16 by the (Government of Uttar Pradesh). In March 2017, the Ministry of Youth Affairs and Sports, Government of India, appointed him as the national observer for hockey.

Early life and education
Jagbir was born into a Sikh family in Agra in, Uttar Pradesh, his father Darshan Singh Khanuja also played hockey and organised the all-India Dhyan Chand tournament in the city. He is an alumnus of the Guru Gobind Singh Sports College, Lucknow.

Career
Described as a 'Striking-circle assassin' during his playing days, the fleet-footed sardar also had the honour of representing the All-Star Asia XI which won the '5 Continent World Classic Cup' in Kuala Lumpur in 1990 and played for World XI (Friendly match) in 1993 in Mönchengladbac. The only Indian player so far, to play in Germany for HTC Stuttgart Kickers in the German Hockey Bundesliga 'Premier League from 1992–97.

Coaching career
He was the coach of the Indian men's team in the 2004 Olympics in Athens, Test series against Pakistan/Spain/France and the Champions Trophy held the same year in Lahore. He has attended various FIH coaching seminars and 'Advanced coaching' courses of FIH.
FIH appointed him as the Coaching Course Conductor for the Olympic Solidarity Coaching Programme held at Nepal in 2008. He is also the coach for Jaypee Punjab Warriors team in Hockey India League 2013 onwards.

Media columnist and commentator career

He has been a popular commentator on TV and a much-sought after columnist and opinion-maker on hockey in several prestigious national and regional newspapers and magazines in India. He has been part of the commentary and expert analysis team in almost all the major competitions like the Olympics, World Cup, Commonwealth Games, Asian Games, Asia Cup, and other international and domestic tournaments on ESPN, Ten Sports, Doordarshan, NDTV, Times Now, CNN IBN etc.

References

External links
 
 

1965 births
Living people
People from Agra
Indian Sikhs
Olympic field hockey players of India
Field hockey players at the 1988 Summer Olympics
Field hockey players at the 1992 Summer Olympics
Indian field hockey coaches
Indian sports broadcasters
Indian sportswriters
Male field hockey forwards
Recipients of the Arjuna Award
Field hockey players from Uttar Pradesh
Indian male field hockey players
Guru Gobind Singh Sports College, Lucknow alumni
Field hockey players at the 1986 Asian Games
Field hockey players at the 1990 Asian Games
Asian Games medalists in field hockey
Asian Games silver medalists for India
Asian Games bronze medalists for India
Medalists at the 1986 Asian Games
Medalists at the 1990 Asian Games
1990 Men's Hockey World Cup players